Bobby Kemp (May 29, 1959 – February 7, 1998) was an American football safety who played seven seasons with the Cincinnati Bengals and Tampa Bay Buccaneers in the National Football League (NFL).

College career
After attending Taft College, a junior college in Taft, California, he played college football at California State University, Fullerton for two seasons, with five interceptions his junior year (1979) and three his senior year (1980). He was selected by the Bengals in the eighth round of the 1981 NFL Draft.

Professional career
During his rookie season (1981), Kemp was the starting strong safety as the Bengals defeated the San Diego Chargers in the coldest game in NFL history, the AFC Championship Game dubbed the "Freezer Bowl" on January 10, 1982. With the Bengals holding a 17–7 lead and the Chargers offense driving late in the first half, Kemp intercepted a Dan Fouts pass to Kellen Winslow to thwart the drive.  The Bengals went on to win, 27–7.  The win propelled the Bengals to Super Bowl XVI, which they lost, 26–21, to the San Francisco 49ers. Kemp was the Bengals starter at strong safety in that game.

During his seven seasons as a strong safety and free safety with the Bengals, he played in 83 games, starting 69 of those. In 1983, he had three interceptions, and a career-best four in 1984.  His last year in the NFL was in 1987 for the Buccaneers, for whom he started and played in 12 games as a strong safety with one interception.

Post NFL
Kemp later became a paramedic in Glendale, California, after retiring from football due to knee problems.  He met his first wife, Christy, when they were students at Taft College. They were married for 13 years.  On February 7, 1998, Kemp committed suicide in his North Hollywood, California home. He was 38. He was survived by his second wife, Inga, and their two-year-old daughter, Mishaelle Kemp.

References

1959 births
1998 deaths
American football safeties
Cal State Fullerton Titans football players
Cincinnati Bengals players
Tampa Bay Buccaneers players
California State University, Fullerton alumni
Players of American football from Oakland, California
People from Taft, California
People from Glendale, California